P. Alfred James (1931–1983) was an Indian Academic, best known for his association with the Kakatiya University, a State-run University u/s 2 (f) of the University Grants Commission Act, 1956 where he was Professor and Head of the Department of Public Administration in the 1970s.  He was also a member of the Indian Institute of Public Administration in which he was an active member, chairing sessions of its annual workshops.  The Institute condoled his sudden death in 1983.  As part of his research forte, he also used to contribute his writings (see section on writings below) to many journals and was also a book reviewer in the Indian Journal of Public Administration.

It was only in 1976 that the Kakatiya University was founded in Warangal with Kailasa Venkata Ramiah as the first Vice-Chancellor.  The faculty were much inspired to take their respective departments to new heights by improvising on the academics and contributed much towards scholarship.  The public administration department was one such faculty which gave impetus to new Scholars.  Alfred James broke new ground in research and mentored many Scholars.

Alfred James had a cross-cultural academic record studying in three different universities and had been guided and mentored by various Scholars.  The Old Testament Scholar, E. C. John, a recipient of the prestigious Alexander von Humboldt Foundation research fellowship in the 1960s wrote that it had been a tradition in Germany for students to study in as many universities as possible under different Scholars and deepen their understanding and inculcate a sense of scholarship.  Such has been the academic pursuit of Alfred James, that he had not only been a Scholar in north India studying under able Scholars, but also studied in south India and gained profound knowledge and a flair for research from his Professors.  Later on in his career, he could easily relate himself in national proceedings in matters of public administration where his contribution has been substantial.

Early life and studies
Alfred James was born in Narsapur, West Godavari district in Andhra Pradesh on 17 August 1931 and was raised a Christian as a member of the Lutheran community.  After scholastic studies, he pursued sciences at Andhra University, waltair, where he graduated with a B. Sc. (Honours) in 1951.  Prof. M. Kistaiah, writing in the memorial volume to his honour, brings out the fact that Alfred James was for sometime employed in Ceylon.

He then showed interest for pursuing higher University education and enrolled at the Nagpur University for a postgraduation in Public Administration under Professor M. P. Sharma, a notable academic.  After passing through with an M. A., he also seemed to have pursued a course in jurisprudence leading to LL.B.

Professor Alfred James began his doctoral studies at Osmania University where he submitted his dissertation entitled Municipal administration in Andhra Pradesh and was awarded a Ph. D. in the year 1966

Teaching
Alfred James began teaching at his alma mater, Osmania University in the Department of Public Administration where he initially was a Lecturer.  Later, he became a Reader He was active in the local academic forums.

From 1972 to 1976, Alfred James was Professor and Head of the Post graduate Centre, Warangal.  He later became Head of the Department of Public Administration.

During his tenure at the Kakatiya University, Prof. James was of the rank of Professor and guided many students in their doctoral studies.

Legacy and reminisce
With the sudden death of Alfred James in the University on 3 May 1983, colleagues and students came together and instituted an annual Endowment in honour of P. A. James by which annual lectures are taking place at the Kakatiya University through public discourses by doyens of public administration, who are being invited to lecture.  During the 12th endowment, Prof. D. Ravindra Prasad of Administrative Staff College of India presented a paper entitled Our urban futures: Towards Good Governance and Sustainability.  The said endowment lectures continue to benefit not only the new Scholars in their research, but also to the emerging trends in public administration.

A couple of years' after his death, colleagues of Alfred James, who once were his students, came again together and contributed essays to his memory which was published in 1986 under the title, Public policy and administration: Essays in memory of Prof. P. A. James.  This was simultaneously reviewed in The Indian Journal of Political Science in 1986 and Yojana in 1987.  The contributory volume has reached far and wide and available in nearly 50 major university library holdings across the globe.

Prof. M. Kistaiah in  the preface to Public policy and administration: Essays in memory of Prof. P.A. James, which was published in 1986, reminisces,

Articles published

In books

In journals

See also

 Prof. Dr. M. Abel, Ph. D. (California),
 Prof. Dr. T. D. J. Nagabhushanam, Ph. D. (IARI),
 Dr. J. A. Oliver, Ph. D. (ANGRAU),
 Prof. Dr. B. E. Vijayam, Ph. D. (Osmania),
 Prof. Dr. P. Judson, Ph. D. (Osmania)

References

Further reading
 
 
 
 

Telugu people
20th-century Indian social scientists
Andhra Pradesh academics
1931 births
Scientists from Hyderabad, India
Indian academic administrators
Andhra University alumni
Osmania University alumni
Rashtrasant Tukadoji Maharaj Nagpur University alumni
1983 deaths
Indian Lutherans
Public administration
Public administration scholars
20th-century Lutherans